Army of the Mississippi was the name given to two Union armies that operated around the Mississippi River, both with short existences, during the American Civil War.

History

1862

The first army was created on February 23, 1862, with  Maj. Gen. John Pope in command.  At its creation, the army consisted of 2 divisions of infantry for service along the Mississippi River.  When General Pope began to move against New Madrid, Missouri, the army was expanded with units from neighboring military districts.  The army now totaled 5 divisions commanded respectively by David S. Stanley, Schuyler Hamilton, John M. Palmer, Eleazar A. Paine and Joseph B. Plummer. Gordon Granger commanded the Cavalry Division of two regiments and Napoleon B. Buford commanded the "Flotilla Brigade". In this capacity the Army fought at the Battle of Island Number Ten. 

After the capture of Island No. Ten, the army's divisions were consolidated into 3 divisions and became the "Left Wing" of Maj. Gen. Henry Halleck's Western Army Group. General Jefferson C. Davis's division from the Army of the Southwest was added, becoming the 4th Division.  During the Siege of Corinth the Army of the Mississippi was consolidated into two wings of two divisions each. Maj. Gen. William S. Rosecrans commanded the "Left Wing" (1st and 2nd Divisions) and  Brig. Gen. Schuyler Hamilton commanded the "Right Wing" (3rd and 4th Divisions).  After the capture of Corinth, Pope was sent east to command the Army of Virginia and Maj. Gen. William S. Rosecrans assumed command of the Army of the Mississippi.  The army was posted to the city of Corinth.  Its position there was strengthened by two divisions from the Army of West Tennessee and fought at the battles of Iuka and Corinth.  Rosecrans was transferred to command of the Army of the Ohio and the current army was discontinued in October 1862 and the regiments were dispersed between the XIII Corps and XIV Corps.

1863

In 1863 Maj. Gen. John A. McClernand was put in command of the expedition against down the Mississippi.  He was given command of two corps from the Army of the Tennessee, his own XIII Corps led by Brig. Gen. George W. Morgan and Maj. Gen. William T. Sherman's XV Corps.  McClernand named his force the "Army of the Mississippi" and redesignated the XIII Corps the I Corps, Army of the Mississippi, and the XV Corps became the II Corps, Army of the Mississippi.  McClernand was successful in capturing Arkansas Post. Maj. Gen. Ulysses S. Grant did not like McClernand and after Sherman and Admiral Andrew H. Foote both voiced their opinions that McClernand was unfit to command, Grant personally took command of the expedition against Vicksburg and the old XIII Corps and XV Corps were returned to the Army of the Tennessee on January 12, 1863.

Command history
1862

1863

References
 Eicher, John H., & Eicher, David J., Civil War High Commands, Stanford University Press, 2001, .

External links
 Army Organization during the Civil War
 Army of the Mississippi

Mississippi, Army of the
Missouri in the American Civil War
Mississippi in the American Civil War
Arkansas in the American Civil War
1862 establishments in the United States
Military units and formations established in 1862
Military units and formations disestablished in 1863
1863 disestablishments in the United States